Daniel P. Vrakas (born October 31, 1955) is a Wisconsin Republican politician and businessman.

Personal life
Born in Waukesha, Wisconsin, Vrakas graduated from Waukesha High School (now Waukesha South) in 1974 and from the University of Wisconsin–Stevens Point in 1979. He was a restaurant owner. Vrakas lives in Waukesha County's Lake Country area.

Political career
From 1991 to 2005, Vrakas served in the Wisconsin State Assembly, representing the 33rd Assembly District. In the Assembly, he was the Republican Caucus Chairman. In 2005, he resigned from the Assembly to run for County Executive of Waukesha County. He was elected County Executive in a special election held on October 18, 2005, and was re-elected to serve a four-year term in 2006, and again in 2011. In November 2014, Vrakas announced that he would retire as Waukesha County Executive. He confirmed that he had been treated for prostate cancer.

Notes

Politicians from Waukesha, Wisconsin
University of Wisconsin–Stevens Point alumni
Businesspeople from Wisconsin
County executives in Wisconsin
Republican Party members of the Wisconsin State Assembly
1955 births
Living people
21st-century American politicians